The molecular formula C29H50O2 (molar mass: 430.70 g/mol, exact mass: 430.3811 u) may refer to:

 Tocopherol (TCP)
 α-Tocopherol

Molecular formulas